Showcase is an extension for the Mozilla Firefox, Flock, and SeaMonkey (as a special port named "Seamonkey Showcase") web browsers. Its function is to show all open browsers as thumbnails, and it offers capabilities like search and tab organization.

Showcase earned the "Best Use of New Firefox 1.5 Features" award for the Extend Firefox contest.

External links
Official Homepage
Mozilla Add-ons Page

Free Firefox legacy extensions